Volleyball at the Games of the Small States of Europe may refer to:

 Men's Volleyball at the Games of the Small States of Europe
 Women's Volleyball at the Games of the Small States of Europe